The following are the Pulitzer Prizes for 1931.

Journalism awards

Public Service:
The Atlanta Constitution, for a successful municipal graft exposure and consequent convictions.
Reporting:
A. B. MacDonald of The Kansas City Star, for his work in connection with a murder in Amarillo, Texas.
Correspondence:
H. R. Knickerbocker of the Philadelphia Public Ledger and New York Evening Post, for a series of articles on the practical operation of the Five Year Plan in Russia.
Editorial Writing:
Charles S. Ryckman of Fremont Tribune, for the editorial entitled "The Gentleman from Nebraska."
Editorial Cartooning:
Edmund Duffy of The Baltimore Sun, for "An Old Struggle Still Going On".

Letters and Drama Awards
Novel:
Years of Grace by Margaret Ayer Barnes (Houghton)
Drama:
Alison's House by Susan Glaspell (S. French)
History:
The Coming of the War 1914 by Bernadotte E. Schmitt (Scribner)
Biography or Autobiography:
Charles W. Eliot by Henry James (Houghton)
Poetry:
Collected Poems by Robert Frost (Holt)

References

External links
Pulitzer Prizes for 1931

Pulitzer Prizes by year
Pulitzer Prize
Pulitzer Prize